Gat Decor (or Gat Décor) were an English electronic music group popular with the 1992 song "Passion". The song is considered to be one of the best-known works of the early progressive house genre.

The main contributors of the team are the British DJs and producers, Simon Slater, Laurence Nelson-Boudville and Simon Hanson.  The name 'Gat Decor' was derived from an anagram of 'Tag Records', a record store based in Soho, London.

Although Gat Decor does not have an extensive catalog (two proper singles and a handful of remixes), the act and "Passion" are widely considered influential to electronic dance music in the early 1990s; and Slater still continues to license "Passion".

Discography

Singles
 1992 "Passion" (#29 UK)
 1996 "Passion" (remix) (#6 UK)
 1996 "In the Head" / "Barefoot in the Head"

Remixes
 1992 Euphoria "Love You Right"
 1992 The Odd Company "Swing in Trance"
 1992 D'lusion "Take You There"
 1993 Latitude "Building a Bridge"
 1993 JFK "Here They Come Again"
 1993 Country & Western "Positive Energy"
 1994 Jean Michel Jarre "Chronologie Part 6"
 1994 The Good Strawberries "Eyes on a Summer Day"

See also

Phunky Phantom

References

External links
 Official site
 Official Myspace

English house music groups
British musical trios
Club DJs
Musical groups from the London Borough of Hammersmith and Fulham
Remixers
Progressive house musicians